Tuart Hill is a suburb of Perth, Western Australia.

Tuart Hill is named after the tuart tree that once grew extensively throughout the area, especially around Dog Swamp. In 1914 the suburb name of Grenville was proposed as a name for the suburb by the Grenville Progress Association, but not accepted due to its likeness to Granville in New South Wales.

Events
Since 1914, the Osborne Park Agricultural Society holds its annual show at Robinson Reserve in Tuart Hill.
The show is usually held around the first weekend in December on Friday and Saturday and features displays of local produce, animals and livestock, carnival attractions and fireworks.

Facilities
Tuart Hill has two large active recreation reserves: Grenville Reserve and Robinson Reserve. Grenville Reserve is a large cricket and football oval with facilities includes Council tennis courts, playground, cricket nets and centre wicket, change rooms, club rooms and public toilets. The ground is used by the Tuart Hill Cricket Club during summer months and various users during winter. Robinson Reserve similarly hosts cricket during summer with the Osborne Park Cricket Club being located at the reserve, since 1919. Robinson Reserve is adjacent to the Osborne Library and Community Centre.

Schools
There are two primary schools in Tuart Hill, the public Tuart Hill Primary School and the private St Kieran Catholic Primary School. Tuart Hill Primary School is heritage listed, having opened in 1910 as the Grenville State School. Servite College, a Catholic high school, is the only high school in Tuart Hill. Tuart Hill Senior High School once existed but was closed in the early 1980s to become Tuart College, a senior college run by the Western Australian Education Department, offering a number of courses such as a year 12 TEE program for students wanting to enter tertiary education, adult learning classes, or English language courses.

Notable residents
 Courtney Murphy - 2nd runner up of Australian Idol 2004
 Greg Egan - hard science fiction writer

References

Suburbs of Perth, Western Australia
Suburbs in the City of Stirling